The Bara ground skink (Scincella baraensis)  is a species of skink found in Vietnam.

References

Scincella
Reptiles described in 2020
Taxa named by Sang Ngoc Nguyen
Taxa named by Vu Dang Hoang Nguyen
Taxa named by Luan Thanh Nguyen
Taxa named by Robert W. Murphy
Endemic fauna of Vietnam